Matanzas Beach is an unincorporated community in Bath and Havana townships, Mason County, Illinois, United States.

References

Unincorporated communities in Mason County, Illinois
Unincorporated communities in Illinois